Bussemaker is a surname. Notable people with the surname include:

Carel Hendrik Theodoor Bussemaker (1864–1914), Dutch historian
Harmen  Bussemaker (born 1968), Dutch and American biological physicist and professor
Jet Bussemaker (born 1961), Dutch politician